Empire City may refer to:

Places in the United States
 Empire City (California), a historic landmark in Empire, California
 Empire City, Kansas, an unincorporated community
 Empire City, Nevada, a former town site absorbed by Carson City
 Empire City, Oklahoma, a town
 Empire City, Oregon (1853), former county seat of Coos County, Oregon and, since 1965, the Empire district of the city of Coos Bay, Oregon
 Empire City, a nickname for New York City
 Empire City, a nickname for Glen Falls, New York

Arts, entertainment, and media

Fictional entities
Empire City (comics), a fictional place in the DC Universe
 Empire City, a fictional city that is home to Courageous Cat and Minute Mouse
 Empire City, the fictional city in which the video game inFAMOUS is set
 Empire City, a fictional city featured in the animated series COPS
 Empire City, a fictional city featured in the animated series Steven Universe
 Empire City, the fictional city setting for Superhero Movie

Literature
The Empire City, a 1959 novel by Paul Goodman
Empire City, a 2020 novel by Matt Gallagher

Video games
 Empire City, an extra track of the EA game Need For Speed III: Hot Pursuit
 Empire City, a level in the Sonic the Hedgehog game Sonic Unleashed
 Empire City: 1931, a video game by Seibu Kaihatsu

Other uses
MV Empire City, a British merchantman sunk by U-198 during World War II
 Yonkers Raceway & Empire City Casino, a New York Thoroughbred horse racing facility opened in 1899 that became Yonkers Raceway and expanded to include Empire City Casino

See also
Empire (disambiguation)
Empire State (disambiguation)